The  (ILMR) has awarded the Carl von Ossietzky Medal since 1962. The league has honored personalities, initiatives or organizations who have worked with civil courage and outstanding commitment to the realization of human rights annually since 1962 and at least once every two years from 2011 with the Carl von Ossietzky Medal it donated. The award is named after the German pacifist and Nobel Peace Prize laureate Carl von Ossietzky, who died in 1938 as a result of imprisonment in a concentration camp.

Recipients 

 1962: Otto Lehmann-Russbüldt
 1963: 
 1964: Joseph Wulf
 1965: Heinrich Grüber
 1966: Fritz von Unruh
 1967: Günter Grass
 1968: Kai Hermann
 1969: Robert Kempner
 1970: Walter Fabian
 1971: Walter Schulze for the Internationaler Arbeitskreis Sonnenberg
 1972: Carola Stern – Amnesty International
 1973: Helmut Gollwitzer
 1974: Heinrich Böll
 1975: Heinrich Albertz
 1976: Betty Williams, Mairead Corrigan, Ciaran McKeown for Peace People, Irland
 1977: Willi Bleicher, Dr. Helmut Simon
 1978: Rudolf Bahro
 1979: Fritz Eberhard, Axel Eggebrecht
 1980: Ingeborg Drewitz
 1981: Gert Bastian
 1982: William Borm
 1983: Heinz Brandt, Martin Niemöller
 1984: Günter Wallraff
 1985: Lea Rosh
 1986: Erich Fried
 1987: Eberhard Carl, Eckart Rottka, Imme Storsberg – Richter und Staatsanwälte für den Frieden
 1988: Klaus Bednarz
 1989: Antje Vollmer, Friedrich Schorlemmer
 1990: 
 1991: Liselotte Funcke
 1992: Wolfgang Richter, Thomas Euting, Dietmar Schumann, Thomas Höper, Jürgen Podzkiewitz, Jochen Schmidt – ZDF editorial team Kennzeichen D
 1993: Aziz Nesin, Karl Finke
 1994:  and the Grips-Theater Berlin
 1995: Jacob Finci for La Benevolencija; Hans Koschnick
 1996: The Saturday women of Istanbul
 1997: Hannes Heer for the team of the exhibition Wehrmachtsausstellung
 1998: Madjiguène Cissé und Les Collectifs des SANS-PAPIERS
 1999: Simin Behbahani und Monireh Baradaran
 2000: Brandenburger Flüchtlingsinitiative, Association Opferperspektive and Tagesspiegel editor Frank Jansen
 2001: Ökumenische Bundesarbeitsgemeinschaft Asyl in der Kirche
 2002: Eberhard Radczuweit und Marina Schubarth for their work at KONTAKTE-Контакты e.V., Association for contacts with countries of the former Soviet Union
 2003: publicist Gerit von Leitner and the citizens' initiative Freie Heide
 2004: Percy MacLean, Esther Béjarano, Peter Gingold, 
 2005: Mechthild Niesen-Bolm and Inge Wannagat and the leisure and advice center Die Arche – Christliches Kinder- und Jugendwerk in Berlin
 2006: lawyer Bernhard Docke and major Florian Pfaff
 2007: Legal Team/Emergency lawyer service for the G8 protests in Heiligendamm
 2008: The Palestinian village's Bil'in Citizens Committee and the Anarchists Against the Wall
 2009: Mouctar Bah and Stefan Schmidt, Captain of the Cap Anamur
 2010: Mordechai Vanunu
 2011: no award
 2012: Peter Lilienthal
 2013: no award
 2014: Edward Snowden, Laura Poitras und Glenn Greenwald
 2015: no award
 2016: SOS Méditerranée und 
 2018: Leyla İmret und social worker Ottmar Miles-Paul
 2020: Otfried Nassauer

Gallery

References

External links
 

Human rights awards
Awards established in 1962
1962 establishments in Germany